Victrix marginelota is a moth of the family Noctuidae. It is endemic to Lebanon and Israel.

Adults are on wing from August to October. There is one generation per year.

External links
The Acronictinae, Bryophilinae, Hypenodinae and Hypeninae of Israel

Acronictinae
Moths of the Middle East
Moths described in 1888